Barnet Gate Wood is a public open space in Barnet Gate, Barnet, London. It is owned and managed by the London Borough of Barnet, and is part of the Watling Chase Community Forest.

It is a small ancient wood, with a canopy of oak and hornbeam, and an understorey dominated by rhododendron.
Some of the hornbeam are in strange shapes as they were originally trained as hedges and then allowed go wild.

The entrance is by a path from Hendon Wood Lane, near the junction with Barnet Road. There is also access from the Dollis Valley Greenwalk and London Loop, at wooden posts numbered 12 and 13, which are points on the Barnet Gate Wood Nature Trail.

Barnet Gate Wood is part of Moat Mount Open Space and Mote End Farm, a Site of Borough Importance for Nature Conservation, Borough Grade II.

See also
 Nature reserves in Barnet

Notes

External links

 Barnet Gate Wood Nature Trail, Hertfordshire Community & Living

 

Nature reserves in the London Borough of Barnet
Parks and open spaces in the London Borough of Barnet
Ancient woods of London
Arkley